Prince Sattam Bin Abdulaziz University was formerly known as Prince Salman Bin Abdulaziz University or the University of Al-Kharj . It is a Saudi University  located in the city of Al-Kharj, Saudi Arabia. It is under the supervision of the Ministry of Higher Education Saudi Arabia and managed by the Rector of the University, Dr. Abdulaziz Abdullah Alhamid.

The university offers a range of undergraduate, graduate, and postgraduate programs in various fields, including humanities, social sciences, engineering, business, medicine, and health sciences. In addition to academic programs, PSAU also offers a range of extracurricular activities, including sports, cultural events, and community service initiatives.

History

The university was established by royal decree in 2007 to transfer a branch of King Saud University in Al-Kharj to the independent university called the University of Al-Kharj, and the accession of all colleges in the saih, Dalam, Wadi dawaser, Hawtat Bani Tamim, Aflaj, and Alhareeq. On 23/10/1432 (Muslim calendar) the name of the university was modified by a royal decree to the University of Prince Salman bin Abdulaziz. Since the beginning of 1436-2015 its name has become Prince Sattam bin Abdulaziz University (PSAU).

Former Rectors 
Dr. Abdulrahman Mohammed Alasimi (2009 to 2017).

Dr. Abdulaziz Abdullah Alhamid, (2017 until 2021).

Dr. Abdulrahman H. Altalhi (2021 until now).

Administration

Top management 

 Rector Office

Vice rectories 

 Vice-Rectorate
 Vice-Rectorate of Female Students Affairs
 Vice-Rectorate of Education and Academic Affairs
 Vice-Rectorate of Development and Quality
 Vice-Rectorate of Postgraduate Studies and Scientific Research
 Vice-Rectorate of Branches

Deanships 

 Deanship of Preparatory Year
 Deanship of Scientific Research
 Deanship of Development and Quality
 Deanship of Postgraduate Studies
 Deanship of Admission and Registration
 Deanship of Human Resources
 Deanship of Student Affairs
 Deanship of IT and Distance Learning
 Deanship of Library Affairs
 Deanship of Community Service and Continuing Education

Campuses and Academics

PSAU main campus is located in Al Kharj. Other campuses are located on Wadi Addawasir, Hotat Bani Tamim, Aflaj, and Slayel.

Colleges located in Al Kharj are:
College of Medicine
The college contains these departments:  Basic Medical Departments, Department of Pediatrics, Department of Internal Medicine, Department of Surgery, and Department of Gynecology and Obstetrics
College of Pharmacy 
Department of Pharmaceutics 
Department of Pharmacology
Department of Clinical Pharmacy 
Department of Pharmacognosy
Department of Pharmaceutical Chemistry
College of Dentistry
Department of Teeth Reformation
 Department of Oral and Maxillofacial Surgery and Diagnostic Sciences
 Department of Prosthetic Dental Sciences
 Department of Preventive Dental
 College of Applied Medical Sciences
 Department of Physical Therapy & Health Rehabilitation
 Department of Radiology and Medical Imaging
 Department of Nursing
 Department of Medical Laboratory Sciences
 Department of Biomedical Equipment Technology
 College of Education
 Department of Arabic Language
 Department of Islamic Studies
 Kindergarten Department
 Department of Curriculum and Instruction
 Department of Educational Sciences
 Department of Psychology
 Department of Special Education
College of Computer Engineering and Sciences
Department of Computer Engineering
Department of Software Engineering
Department of Computer Science
Department of Information System
College of Business Administration
Management Department
Marketing Department
Finance Department
Accounting Department
Human Resources Department
Management Information Systems Department
College of Sciences and Humanities
 Department of Mathematics
 Department of Physics
 Department of English
 Department of Law
 Department of Chemistry
 Department of Biology
College of Engineering
Department of Civil Engineering
Department of Mechanical Engineering
Department of Electrical Engineering
Department of Industrial Engineering
Community College
Department of Computing
Department of English Language
Department of Business Administration
College of Engineering - Wadi Addawasir
Department of Electrical Engineering
Department of Mechanical Engineering
Department of Computer Engineering
College of Applied Medical Sciences - Wadi Addawasir
 Department of Medical Devices
 Department of Health Rehabilitation
 Department of Emergency Medical Services
 Department of Radiological Sciences
 Department of Medical Laboratory
 Department of Community Health
 Department of Nursing Science
 College of Education - Wadi Addawasir
 Department of Special Education
 Department of Home Economics
 Department of Islamic Studies
 Department of Educational Sciences
 Department of English
 Department of Arabic Language
 Department of kindergarten
 College of Arts and Sciences - Wadi Addawasir
 Department of Computer Science
 Department of Mathematics
 Department of English Language and Literature
 Department of Arabic Language and Literature
College of Business Administration at Hotat Bani Tamim
Department of Management Information Systems
Department of Accounting
College of Sciences and Humanities - Hotat Bani Tamim
 Department of Islamic Studies
 Department of Mathematics
 Department of Chemistry
 Department of Arabic Language
 English Department
 IS Department
 College of Sciences and Humanities - Slayel
 Department of English
 Department of Arabic Language
 Department of Mathematics
 Department of Computer Science
 Department of Business Administration
 Department of Islamic Studies
 College of Sciences and Humanities- Aflaj
 Department of Islamic Studies
 Department of Business Administration
 Department of Mathematics
 Department of Physics
 Department of Chemistry
 Department of English
 Department of Arabic Language 
 Department of Accounting
 Department of Computer Science
 Community College- Aflaj
 Department of Administrative Sciences and Humanities - Business Administration
 Department of Administrative Sciences and Humanities - Sales Management
 Department of Administrative Sciences and Humanities - English
 Department of Applied Medical Sciences - Medical Devices
 Department of Applied Medical Sciences - Nursing
 Department of Applied Natural Sciences - Computer
 Department of Applied Natural Sciences - Mathematics

Institute of Research & Consulting Services 
The Institute of Research and Consulting Services was founded upon the resolution of Higher Education Council No. (62) 5/12/2010. The resolution was approved by The Custodian of The Two Holy Mosques, the Prime Minister and the Chairman of the Higher Education Council directive dispatch No. 446/M/B Dated on 27/12/2010. Under which the Institute is entitled to conduct paid studies, provide consultancy, scientific, and research services for all government and civil sectors.

University Hospital 
The University Hospital includes all medical specialties and provides its services through 36 general and specialized clinics, in addition to male and female clinics in the colleges.

University's Endowments 
It is a program established by Prince Sattam bin Abdulaziz University, this program aims to enhance the role of the university in activating partnerships and community service and development, and to achieve self-sufficiency for the university's resources to be self-contained, as endowment incomes are spent on supporting activities and research and advancing scientific research and study centers that lead to improving the university level In international classifications and strengthening research and development efforts and education, support for university hospitals and health research to treat chronic diseases and conduct research beneficial to humanity, and activate the relationship between the university and society.

Endowments objectives 
1. Funding scholarships for needy students and supporting the fields of righteousness, charity, and social and health solidarity in the university community and the governorates in it.

2. Supporting research projects that address the governorates' problems and serve their development goals.

3. Developing human resources at the university, and attracting distinguished scientific, administrative and investment capabilities.

4. Supporting the long-term operational and production budget for future generations.

5. Development of the university's own resources to stimulate creativity, innovation and performance excellence.

6. Financing the infrastructure of the university’s educational process in all its specializations.

7. Supporting the development programs, and stimulating creativity and talent among male and female students.

University Ranking

Notable Persons 

 Professor Dr. Usman Tariq  (Computer Science and Engineering)
Dr. Ismot Kabir, former clinical lecturer in medicine.
Dr. Manjur Kolhar  (Computer Science)
Dr. Abdalla Alameen  (Head of the Department, Computer Science)

References

2009 establishments in Saudi Arabia
Educational institutions established in 2009
Prince Sattam bin Abdulaziz University
Riyadh Province